L.P. Frans Stadium is a stadium in Hickory, North Carolina. It is primarily used for baseball, and is the home field of the Hickory Crawdads Minor League Baseball team of the South Atlantic League. It was built in 1993 and has a fixed seating capacity of roughly 4,000.

Location
It was built on land donated by Elmer Winkler in 1993 and named after the local Pepsi-Cola bottler who partially funded the stadium's construction.

Improvements
Improvements made to the stadium after the 2013 season brought a brand new VIP section, a picnic pavilion, and three outdoor party patios. A completely renovated Crawdads Cafe, suites, and concourse were also a part of the improvements.
Following the 2017 season, another round of renovations was announced. The renovations included a new HD video board, a new playing surface, renovated dugouts, replacing the outfield walls, and removing the support poles holding up the protective netting to improve sightlines.

References

External links
Hickory Crawdads: L.P. Frans Stadium
Little Ball Parks profile

Minor league baseball venues
Baseball venues in North Carolina
Buildings and structures in Catawba County, North Carolina
1993 establishments in North Carolina
Sports venues completed in 1993
South Atlantic League ballparks